Consolidated financial statements are the "financial statements of a group in which the assets, liabilities, equity, income, expenses and cash flows of the parent company and its subsidiaries are presented as those of a single economic entity", according to International Accounting Standard 27 "Consolidated and separate financial statements", and International Financial Reporting Standard 10 "Consolidated financial statements".

Consolidated statement of financial position 
While preparing a consolidated financial statement, there are two basic procedures that need to be followed: first, cancel out all the items that are accounted as an asset in one company and a liability in another, and then add together all uncancelled items. 

There are two main type of items that cancel each other out from the consolidated statement of financial position. 
 "Investment in subsidiary companies" which is treated as an asset in the parent company will be cancelled out by "share capital" account in subsidiary's statement. Only the parent company's "share capital" account will be included in the consolidated statement. 
 If trading between different companies in one group happen, then the payables of one company will be cancelled by the receivables of another company.

Goodwill arising on consolidation 

Goodwill is treated as an intangible asset in the consolidated statement of financial position. It arises in cases, where the cost of purchase of shares is not equal to their par value. For example, if a company buys shares of another company worth $40,000 for $60,000, we conclude that there is a goodwill worth or $20,000. 

Proforma for calculating goodwill is as follows:

Goodwill

Fair value of consideration transferred

Plus fair value of non-controlled interest at acquisition

Less ordinary share capital of subsidiary company

Less share premium of subsidiary company

Less retained earnings of subsidiary company at acquisition date

Less fair value adjustments at acquisition date

Non-controlled interest 
If the parent company does not buy 100% of shares of the subsidiary company, there is a proportion of the net assets owned by the external company. This proportion that is related to outside investors is called the non-controlling interest (NCI).

The proforma for calculating the NCI is as follows: 

Non-controlling interest

Fair value of NCI at acquisition date

Plus NCI's share of post-acquisition retained earnings or other reserves

NCI at the reporting date

Intra-group trading 
In a group of companies, they can have trade relations with each other. For example, company A buys goods for one price and sells them to another company inside the group for another price. Thus, company A has earned some revenue from selling, but the group as a whole didn't make any profit out of that transaction. Until those goods are sold to an outsider company, the group has unrealised profit.

See also
Associate company
Business valuation
Consolidation (business)
Enterprise value
Minority interest

References

Further reading
 Alexander, D., Britton, A., Jorissen, A., "International Financial Reporting and Analysis", Second Edition, 2005, 

Financial statements